Honomū is a census-designated place (CDP) in Hawaii County, Hawaii, United States. The population was 509 at the 2010 census, down from 541 at the 2000 census.

Geography
Hawaii Route 19 passes through the community, leading northwest  to Honokaa and south  to Hilo. Hawaii Route 220 leads southwest from Route 19 through the center of Honomu  to its terminus at Akaka Falls State Park.

Demographics

2000 Census data
As of the census of 2000, there were 541 people, 193 households, and 143 families residing in the CDP. The racial makeup of the CDP was 23.29% White, 0.74% Native American, 29.94% Asian, 5.18% Pacific Islander, 2.03% from other races, and 38.82% from two or more races. Hispanic or Latino of any race were 12.20% of the population.

There were 193 households, out of which 26.9% had children under the age of 18 living with them, 50.3% were married couples living together, 16.6% had a female householder with no husband present, and 25.9% were non-families. 19.7% of all households were made up of individuals, and 9.3% had someone living alone who was 65 years of age or older.  The average household size was 2.80 and the average family size was 3.19.

In the CDP the population was spread out, with 24.0% under the age of 18, 5.9% from 18 to 24, 25.0% from 25 to 44, 24.2% from 45 to 64, and 20.9% who were 65 years of age or older.  The median age was 42 years. For every 100 females, there were 89.8 males.  For every 100 females age 18 and over, there were 91.2 males.

The median income for a household in the CDP was $30,179, and the median income for a family was $35,536. Males had a median income of $28,438 versus $19,167 for females. The per capita income for the CDP was $15,190.  About 11.9% of families and 16.6% of the population were below the poverty line, including 27.6% of those under age 18 and 0.9% of those age 65 or over.

Places of worship
The Köyasan Shingon Mission of Hawaii is based in Honomu.

See also

 List of places in Hawaii

References

External links

Census-designated places in Hawaii County, Hawaii
Populated places on Hawaii (island)
Census-designated places in Hawaii
Populated coastal places in Hawaii